Aurélien Giraud (born 3 February 1998) is a French goofy-footed professional street skateboarder from Lyon.

Achievements and highlights

References

External links 
 
 Aurelien Giraud at The Boardr

1998 births
Living people
French skateboarders
French expatriate sportspeople in the United States
Olympic skateboarders of France
Skateboarders at the 2020 Summer Olympics
Sportspeople from Lyon
X Games athletes